Jean François Aimé Théophile Philippe Gaudin or Jean François Aimée Gottlieb Philippe Gaudin (18 March 1766 in Longirod, canton de Vaud - 14 July 1833 in Nyon) was a Swiss pastor, professor and botanist. He was the author of the monumental Flora Helvetica in 7 volumes.

Tributes 
The annual grass genus Gaudinia, belonging to the Poeae, was named after his honor.

See also 
 Jaques Étienne Gay (1786-1864), a Swiss-French botanist and one of the most famous  students of botanist Jean François Aimée Gaudin

References

External links 

19th-century Swiss botanists
1766 births
1833 deaths
Calvinist and Reformed ministers
People from Nyon District
Academic staff of the University of Lausanne
18th-century Swiss botanists